Oak Hall Historic District is a national historic district located at College Township, Centre County, Pennsylvania.  The district includes 17 contributing buildings and 3 contributing structures in Oak Hall.  The district includes the mansion house once owned by General James Irvin, the Irvin stone barn (c. 1825), and grist mill site.  The Irvin Mansion was built about 1825, and is a -story, five bay limestone house with a center hall plan and gable roof.  It features a mix of Georgian and Late Victorian style details.  Associated with the mansion are a small shed, wagon shed / ice house, a smokehouse, and privy.  The remains of the grist mill were rebuilt as a residence in 1961.  Also in the district are the Johnstonbaugh House (c. 1825), Benjamin Peters House (c. 1860), and Garman House (1866).

It was added to the National Register of Historic Places in 1979.

References

Historic districts on the National Register of Historic Places in Pennsylvania
Georgian architecture in Pennsylvania
Historic districts in Centre County, Pennsylvania
National Register of Historic Places in Centre County, Pennsylvania